Matías Boeker (born December 11, 1980) is a former professional tennis player from the United States.

Career
Playing for the University of Georgia in 2001, Boeker became just the third player in NCAA history to win the Division I singles, doubles and team titles in the same year. Boeker, who partnered Travis Parrott in the doubles, was named the Southeastern Conference Male Athlete of the Year. In 2002 he won the singles championship again, to become the first person since Mikael Pernfors in 1985 to win back-to-back titles. He was an All-American in 2000, 2001 and 2002.

Boeker competed in both the men's singles and doubles at the 2002 US Open. He lost in the opening round of the singles to Thomas Enqvist and was also beaten in the first round of the doubles (with Robby Ginepri) to Wayne Arthurs and Andrew Kratzmann.

NCAA titles

Singles: (2)

Doubles: (1)

Challenger titles

Singles: (1)

Doubles: (2)

References

1980 births
Living people
American male tennis players
Georgia Bulldogs tennis players
Argentine emigrants to the United States
Tennis players from Buenos Aires